Buyni Yugun castle is a historical castle located in Nir County in Ardabil Province, The longevity of this fortress dates back to the early Achaemenid Empire.

References 

Castles in Iran
Achaemenid castles